Brazhkivka is a village in Izium Raion (district) in Kharkiv Oblast of eastern Ukraine, at about  SSE from the centre of Kharkiv city. It belongs to Oskil rural hromada, one of the hromadas of Ukraine.  

The village came under attack by Russian forces in June 2022, during the Russian invasion of Ukraine.

References

Villages in Izium Raion